Turan Ceylan (born 12 June 1968) is a Turkish former wrestler. He competed in the men's freestyle 74 kg at the 1996 Summer Olympics.

References

External links
 

1968 births
Living people
Turkish male sport wrestlers
Olympic wrestlers of Turkey
Wrestlers at the 1996 Summer Olympics
Sportspeople from Tokat
Mediterranean Games gold medalists for Turkey
Mediterranean Games medalists in wrestling
Competitors at the 1991 Mediterranean Games
20th-century Turkish people
21st-century Turkish people
World Wrestling Championships medalists